TVCabo may mean
 generally TV via broadband cable
 the former name of ZON Multimédia in Portugal
 TVCabo (Angola) the cable TV provider in Angola
 TVCabo (Moçambique) the cable TV provider in Mozambique

Cable television companies